This list of people in Playboy 2000–2009 is a catalog of women and men who appeared in Playboy magazine between the years 2000 and 2009, inclusive. Not all of the people featured on the cover or in the magazine model in the nude.

Entries in blue indicate that the issue marks the original appearance of that year's Playmate of the Year (PMOY).

2000

2001

2002

2003

2004

2005

2006

2007

2008

2009

See also
 List of people in Playboy 1953–1959
 List of people in Playboy 1960–1969
 List of people in Playboy 1970–1979
 List of people in Playboy 1980–1989
 List of people in Playboy 1990–1999
 List of people in Playboy 2010–2020

References

Playboy lists
Lists of 21st-century people
2000s in mass media
2000s-related lists
Playboy